Darshana KT (born 6 November 1984) is an Indian Tamil playback singer for films in India. She is currently residing in Chicago and shuttles between India and the US for her music projects.

Early career

Darshana did her schooling in Kuwait. She moved to Chennai to continue her education and did her graduate program in Journalism & Media in M.O.P. Vaishnav College, Chennai and Masters in Media Presentation/Production in Loyola College, Chennai. During this period she got the opportunity to work as an intern in The Hindu and later worked for Gautami as her assistant for a year.

Singing
She started singing from an early age of five. She started off as a singer and got to perform as a child artist in Kuwait. Some of the shows worth mentioning are the Ilayaraja Night in 2002 where she shared the stage with the Maestro and did two shows with Playback Singer Mano in 1999. Once she moved back to Chennai in 2003, she recorded many Jingles for leading companies. Between 2004 and 2006, she gave backup vocals for many television sops like Annamalai and Selvi. She also sang in many albums brought out by Manikanth Kadrigopalnath, the son of saxophone maestro Kadri Gopalnath and sang in Veena Maestro Rajesh Vaidya's fusion Albums.

Her passion for music was very strong and hence chose for Music to be her career.  Her first major break was for the Movie "Shivaji – The Boss" for which the music was scored by Oscar Winner A.R.Rahman. She was also the part of A.R.Rahman Times Now show held in Chennai during 2008. She continues to work on her Jazz, R&B and has completed Level 2 in Jazz Vocals from Old Town School of Folk Music, Chicago. She is also pursuing Carnatic & Hindustani Music.

She has won Several Awards at different levels. She was nominated for the 55th Filmfare (South) awards for her debut song "Maduraikki Pogathadi" for the film Azhagiya Thamizh Magan. She has also won the "My Tamizh Movie.com" award in the year 2007 for the same song.

Apart from Movie songs, she is also an independent songwriter/composer.

Filmography

Independent Single/Album

Awards and nominations

 Nominated, Filmfare Award for Best Female Playback Singer – Tamil for the song Maduraikku Pogatheydi. (2007)

References

Singers of A. R. Rahman
Azhagiya Tamizh Magan
Sivaji – The Boss
O Kadhal Kanmani

Living people
Indian women playback singers
Bollywood playback singers
Singers from Chennai
Tamil playback singers
21st-century Indian singers
21st-century Indian women singers
Women musicians from Tamil Nadu
1985 births